Alan MacKenzie (born February 2, 1952) is a Canadian former professional ice hockey defenceman.

Career 
During the 1973–74 season, MacKenzie played two games in the World Hockey Association with the Chicago Cougars. In the IHL, he played for the Fort Wayne Komets and Milwaukee Admirals.

References

External links

1952 births
Living people
Canadian ice hockey defencemen
Chicago Cougars players
Cornwall Royals (QMJHL) players
Erie Blades players
Fort Wayne Komets players
Ice hockey people from Ontario
Sportspeople from Windsor, Ontario
Long Island Cougars players
Maine Nordiques players
Milwaukee Admirals players
Mohawk Valley Comets players